Tiarno di Sotto was a comune (municipality) in the Trentino in the Italian region Trentino-Alto Adige/Südtirol. On January 1, 2010 it merged (with Pieve di Ledro, Bezzecca, Concei, Molina di Ledro and Tiarno di Sopra) in the new municipality of Ledro.  It is located about 40 km southwest of Trento.

References

External links
 Tiarno di Sotto on Ledro official website

Frazioni of Ledro
Former municipalities of Trentino